The 1996 Utah Utes football team represented the University of Utah as a member of the Mountain Division of the Western Athletic Conference (WAC) during the 1996 NCAA Division I-A football season. In their seventh season under head coach Ron McBride, the Utes compiled an overall record of 8–4 record with a mark of 6–2 against conference opponents, tying for second place in the WAC's Mountain Division. Utah was invited the Copper Bowl, where they lost to Wisconsin. The Utes outscored their opponents 313 to 309. The team played home games at Robert Rice Stadium in Salt Lake City.

Utah open the season with a loss at Utah State, but won the next seven game and climbed to a No. 20 ranking in the AP Poll. The winning-streak came to a halt when the Utes suffered their worst loss in six years, to the Rice Owls, giving up 496 yards rushing.  Utah lost three of their final four games, allowing a total 1,439 yards rushing in these four games (359.75 average per game), including a 38–10 loss to the Wisconsin in the Copper Bowl.

Schedule

Roster

After the season

CFL Draft
Chad Folk was selected first overall in the 1997 CFL Draft.

References

Utah
Utah Utes football seasons
Utah Utes football